Daryl Kevin "Razor" Reaugh (pronounced "Ray") (born February 13, 1965) is a retired professional ice hockey goaltender and now a broadcaster for the Dallas Stars of the National Hockey League (NHL), NHL on NBC and Hockey Night in Canada. He played 27 games in the NHL for the Edmonton Oilers and Hartford Whalers between 1985 and 1991.

Biography

Playing career
Reaugh played for the Kamloops Blazers of the Western Hockey League where he was an All-Star goaltender. In the 1984 NHL Entry Draft the Edmonton Oilers selected Reaugh with the 42nd pick. He played a handful of games with the Oilers, but spent the majority of his six years in the organization in the American Hockey League. He does have a Stanley Cup ring, and is on the 1988 Edmonton Oilers team pictures, but Edmonton chose not to include his name on the Cup, even though he dressed for 60 regular season games, playing only 6 of them. Reaugh played in Finland's SM-liiga during the 1988–89 season.

Reaugh joined the Hartford Whalers in 1990 and played over 1000 minutes, posting a 7–7–1 record and a 3.15 goals against average. His season was cut short after an injury sustained in his 20th appearance. While playing a puck in net, a skate from one of the other players on the ice ran over Reaugh's glove, severely cutting his hand. A hamstring injury would make the 1993–94 season with the Dayton Bombers of the ECHL his last, cutting his promising career short at the age of 28.

Broadcasting
Prior to his work with the Stars, Reaugh first appeared as a regular in 1991 on the American Hockey League-produced weekly series Rinkside, partnered with fellow goaltender Jim Ralph, and was also a color commentator for the Hartford Whalers during the 1995–96 NHL season. Reaugh has also done work with ABC, ESPN, Fox, Versus, and NBC broadcasts of regular season and playoff NHL games, and provided the color commentary in the EA Sports video games NHL '98 and NHL '99.

In 1996, Reaugh joined Stars' play-by-play announcer Ralph Strangis to form the highly popular "Ralph and Razor" duo. In August 2012, Ralph and Razor were ranked the #1 broadcasting duo in the NHL by hockeybuzz.com.

Starting with the 2011–12 NHL season, Reaugh began to broadcast Western Conference games on Hockey Night in Canada in addition to his role as the Dallas Stars color commentator.

As the Stars' color commentator he is known for his deep vocabulary of descriptive words that he uses with almost comedic timing. His most frequent is "larceny", used when a goalie makes a spectacular save.

After the 2014-15 season, Strangis left the Stars and was replaced by Dave Strader. The following summer, Strader was diagnosed with cancer and missed significant time to undergo treatment. The Stars decided to have Reaugh become the permanent play-by-play announcer when Strader died on October 1, 2017. When he was the play-by-play announcer, Reaugh was joined in the booth by former Stars defenseman Craig Ludwig. On July 30, 2018, Reaugh returned as an analyst role. He teams up with play-by-play Josh Bogorad.

Personal life
Reaugh spent a number of years growing up in Prince George, BC. He is also the brother-in-law of former NHL player Brendan Morrison (their wives are sisters). Reaugh also has two daughters.

Career statistics

Regular season and playoffs

Awards
 WHL West Second All-Star Team – 1984
 WHL West First All-Star Team – 1985

References

External links
 

1965 births
Living people
Binghamton Whalers players
Canadian ice hockey goaltenders
Cape Breton Oilers players
Cowichan Valley Capitals players
Dallas Stars announcers
Dayton Bombers players
Edmonton Oilers draft picks
Edmonton Oilers players
Hartford Whalers announcers
Hartford Whalers players
Hershey Bears players
Ice hockey people from British Columbia
Kamloops Blazers players
Kamloops Junior Oilers players
Milwaukee Admirals (IHL) players
National Hockey League broadcasters
Nova Scotia Oilers players
Oulun Kärpät players
Sportspeople from Prince George, British Columbia
Springfield Indians players
Stanley Cup champions